Following is a list of teams that will compete during the 2021–22 curling season.

Men
As of May 19, 2022

Women
As of May 15, 2022

Mixed doubles
As of May 15, 2022

References

2021 in curling
2022 in curling
Curling-related lists